Staten Island Cakes is an American food reality-television series airing on WE tv. The series stars Vincent "Vinny" Buzzetta, an Italian-American cake artist who lives and works on Staten Island, a borough of New York City, New York.

Cast

Vincent "Vinny" Buzzetta
Buzzetta was born on October 4, 1989, in the Brooklyn borough of New York City.  He and his family moved to Staten Island when he was 13 years old, but he continued to attend Xaverian High School in Brooklyn, from which he graduated in 2007.  In February 2008, Buzzetta graduated first in his class from the French Culinary Institutelocated in New York City's Manhattan boroughthe youngest person ever to complete the institute's program.  On October 31, 2008, with financial backing from his grandfather, Buzzetta opened his bakery, The Cake Artist, on Forest Avenue in the West Brighton neighborhood  of Staten Island.

Other cast members

Cammy Picciano, Buzzetta's mother
Kristin Buzzetta, Buzzetta's younger sister
"Crazy Joe" Russo, Buzzetta's grandfather
Spiro Grammatikopoulos, Buzzetta's best friend and life partner
Rob Picciano, Buzzetta's stepfather
Joe Celentano, Buzzetta's cousin
Teresa Vocile, Buzetta's employee
Jess Mari, Buzzetta's employee 
Sam Misiti, Buzzetta's employee

Episodes

References

External links
Staten Island Cakes – WE tv
thecakeartistnyc.com, official website of The Cake Artist

2011 American television series debuts
2010s American cooking television series
2010s American reality television series
Cuisine of New York City
English-language television shows
Food reality television series
Staten Island
Media about cakes
Italian-American culture in New York City